Trinity High School and Sixth Form Centre is a 13-18 co-educational academy school located in central Redditch, Worcestershire, England.

Admissions
The school is located within a few minutes of the Kingfisher Shopping Centre and the area of central Redditch, just north of the roundabout of the A4023 and B4160. The school is on Easemore Road.

About 25% of the students are from minority ethnic backgrounds. The majority of these are of Pakistani origin, with many speaking English as an additional language. A 2010 Ofsted report accorded the school a Grade 2 (Good).

History
The school began as the Redditch County High School, a grammar school with around 1,000 boys and girls, with 200 in the sixth form. The school operated a house system with four houses, Angles, Celts, Jutes and Saxons. The main school buildings designed by Henry Walter Simister opened in 1932. It became a comprehensive school in 1974, and was renamed the Abbey High School after the nearby ruins of Bordesley Abbey, continuing to operate the original house system. In 2001 the Abbey High School was closed and reopened as Trinity High School and Sixth Form Centre.  In 2004, Trinity became a Business and Enterprise specialist school, and on 1 August 2011 Trinity became Redditch’s first Independent State Funded Academy.

Feeder schools
Trinity High School draws the majority of its intake in from its two feeder schools, Birchensale Middle School and Woodfield Academy.

House system
At the start of the 2008/09 school year the House system was reintroduced. The new houses were selected by pupils and voted on by student councillors and are as follows:
 Malvern (Green)
 Bredon (Blue)
 Kinver (Yellow)

Each form group is of the same house and at the end of the year the house with the most points wins the annual House Cup.

Notable former pupils

Abbey High School
 Geoffrey Edmunds, cricketer
 John Taylor, bassist in the group Duran Duran

Redditch County High School
 Bryan Davies, Baron Davies of Oldham, Labour MP for Enfield North from 1974-9 and Oldham Central and Royton from 1992-97
 Norman Neasom, painter
 Ric Sanders, Violin/Fiddle player with Fairport Convention

References

External links
 EduBase

Academies in Worcestershire
Redditch
Educational institutions established in 1932
1932 establishments in England
Upper schools in Worcestershire